"Lady" is a Japanese single from South Korean rock band CNBLUE. This single is taken from their third Japan album What Turns You On?. Beside the standard edition, the single is available with three different editions (Limited Edition A and B version and Family Mart Edition, which look like vinyl because it is an LP size version). Every edition comes with a different instrumental: Limited Edition A comes with an instrumental of "Don't Care," limited Edition B comes with an instrumental of "Monday," regular, FamilyMart, and famima.com limited editions comes with an instrumental of the title track, "Lady."

Track list

Standard Edition

The Standard Edition has three songs and an instrumental.

CD

#1: Lady
#2: Do not care
#3: Monday
#4: Lady (Instrumental)

Family Mart & famima.com Limited Edition

The Family Mart & famima.com Limited Edition has three songs and one instrumental.

CD

#1: Lady
#2: Do not care
#3: Monday
#4: Lady (Instrumental)

Limited Edition A

The Limited Edition A has three songs and one instrumental and a DVD with Lady Music Video and Special Feature and Blind Love LIVE.

CD

#1: Lady
#2: Do not care
#3: Monday
#4: Do not care (Instrumental)

DVD

#1: Lady Music Video
#2: Lady Special Feature
#3: "Blind Love" Release LIVE @ NIKKEI Hall 2013.4.27

First Press Limited Edition B

The Limited Edition B has three songs and one instrumental and a DVD with MY BEAT Stadium LIVE.

CD

#1: Lady
#2: Do not care
#3: Monday
#4: Monday (Instrumental)

DVD

#1: Mezamashiraibu @ Odaiba United States MY BEAT Stadium 2012.8.28

References

2013 singles
CNBLUE songs
Japanese-language songs
Songs written by Jung Yong-hwa
Warner Music Japan singles
2013 songs